The Amargosa Range is a mountain range in Inyo County, California and Nye County, Nevada. The  range runs along most of the eastern side of California's Death Valley, separating it from Nevada's Amargosa Desert.

The mountain range is named after the Amargosa River, so-named for the Spanish word for bitter because of the bitter taste of the water.

In order from north to south, the Grapevine Mountains (including the range's highest point,  Grapevine Peak), the Funeral Mountains, and the Black Mountains form distinct sections.  Many of Death Valley National Park's most well-known features, such as Zabriskie Point and Artists Drive are located in or are part of the Amargosa Range.

References 

Death Valley
Amargosa Desert
Mountain ranges of the Mojave Desert
Mountain ranges of Inyo County, California
Mountain ranges of Nevada
Mountain ranges of Nye County, Nevada
Death Valley National Park
Mountain ranges of Southern California